Carlos Gardel is a station on Line B of the Buenos Aires Underground.

The station is located in the Balvanera barrio, at the intersection of Avenida Corrientes and Calle Agüero. It was opened on 17 October 1930 as part of the inaugural section of the line between Federico Lacroze and Callao.

Overview
Carlos Gardel station runs under the Abasto de Buenos Aires, one of Buenos Aires' most prominent landmarks. There is an underground connection that makes it possible to access the shopping centre from the subway station without going outside to street level.

Although initially when this station was first opened in 1930 it was named Agüero after the road it crosses, it was later renamed Carlos Gardel, after the famous tango singer. He was known as "El Morocho del Abasto" (The Brunette boy from Abasto).

Gallery

References

External links

Buenos Aires Underground stations
Balvanera
Railway stations opened in 1930
1930 establishments in Argentina